Yuria (written: , ,  or  in hiragana) is a feminine Japanese given name. Notable people with the name include:

, Japanese model and actress
, Japanese shogi player
, Japanese actress, singer and idol
, Japanese women's footballer

Japanese feminine given names